Leslie P. Hume (nee Bryant) is an American historian and philanthropist from San Francisco, California. She has published scholarship about the place of women in the Victorian era as well as women's suffrage societies. She served as President of the Board of Trustees of Stanford University from 2008 to 2012, making her the second woman after Jane Stanford ever to do so.

Biography

Early life
Leslie Parker Hume graduated from Radcliffe College in Cambridge, Massachusetts in 1969, where she received a Bachelor of Arts degree in History. She received a master's degree in 1971 and a PhD in 1979 from Stanford University in Stanford, California.

Scholarly career
She edited a volume about women during the Victorian era in 1981 and wrote a book about women's suffrage societies from 1897 to 1914 in 1982. She also worked as a consultant for the Research Libraries Group in Mountain View, California.

Philanthropy
She has served on the Boards of Trustees of The San Francisco Foundation, the San Francisco Opera, Summerbridge National, and the Bay Area Discovery Museum. She was a founding member of the Board of Trustees of the San Francisco Day School, where she served as its President.

She was elected to the board of trustees of Stanford University in 2000. She served as its President from 2008 to 2012, making her the second woman after Jane Stanford to do so. She serves co-Chair the 2013-2014 Advisory Council of Stanford Live, the performing arts organization at Stanford. With her husband, she endowed some fellowships for undergraduate students at Stanford University. They also endowed the Hume Center for Writing and Speaking at Stanford University.

Personal life
She is married to George H. Hume, a businessman, philanthropist, and heir to the Basic American Foods fortune. They have a son and a daughter.

Bibliography

As an editor
Victorian Women: A Documentary Account of Women's Lives in 19th-Century England, France and the United States (Stanford, California: Stanford University Press, 1981).

As an author
The National Union of Women's Suffrage Societies, 1897-1914 (Garland Publishing, 1982).

References

Living people
People from San Francisco
Radcliffe College alumni
Stanford University alumni
21st-century American historians
Philanthropists from California
Stanford University trustees
Year of birth missing (living people)
Historians from California